Knottingley is a market town in the City of Wakefield in West Yorkshire, England on the River Aire and the old A1 road before it was bypassed as the A1(M). Historically part of the West Riding of Yorkshire, it has a population of 13,503, increasing to 13,710 for the City of Wakefield ward at the 2011 Census. It makes up the majority of the Knottingley ward represented on Wakefield Council.

Until 1699, it was an important inland river port but, in that year, the Aire was made navigable as far as Leeds, which soon surpassed it. Knottingley continued as a centre for boat building into the 20th century. In the late 19th century, it started glass manufacturing. The town is served by Knottingley railway station.

After 1870, the town became known for glass manufacturing. In 1887 Bagley's Glassworks purchased the rights to the first bottle-making machine, invented by a Ferrybridge postmaster. There is a Bagley's Glass gallery in Pontefract Museum.

Close to Knottingley is Ferrybridge Power Station, which had the largest cooling towers of their kind in Europe. Three of these towers collapsed in high winds in 1965. The remaining towers, which could be seen for miles around, were demolished between 2019 and 2022.

The town was the last in the United Kingdom to have a working deep coal mine, Kellingley Colliery, until it closed in December 2015.

History

Knottingley means "the clearing of Cnotta's people", from the Old English personal name Cnotta meaning "knot", describing a small, round man and -ingas "people of" + leāh "wood, modern lee, not the same meaning as Leah (personal name)". The name was recorded as Cnotinesleahemm in 1128.

During the three Sieges of Pontefract Castle, Oliver Cromwell took residence in the town of Knottingley, believed to be in Wildbore House. The house was later demolished when its land was mined as a quarry for the limestone underneath.

Knottingley, inextricably linked with Ferrybridge, is a West Yorkshire town whose history is tied to river travel and industry. It has managed to retain certain elements of that industrial history as thriving enterprises today, providing employment for many of its combined population of some 17,000. It was originally an Anglo-Saxon settlement, though the ancient monument of Ferrybridge Henge shows it had significant indigenous habitation long before then.

The crossing over the Aire at Ferrybridge was of importance for many centuries. A bridge was built there in 1198, and another to replace it two centuries later. Located on the Great North Road linking London with York and Edinburgh beyond that, the town became an important staging place for the coach traffic on that route.

Knottingley was an inland port of some note, long the last navigable point on the Aire until the Aire and Calder Navigation, built in 1704 and widened in 1826, enabled barges to make it to Leeds. Its shipyards built and maintained both inland and seagoing vessels. Pottery was a significant industry for the town from the 19th century until as late as the 1940s, when the Australian Pottery, opened to cater to that country's needs, finally closed.

Glass manufacturing continues to be important. The town had Kellingley Colliery operating until December 2015. The demand for coal was helped by the huge power station at Ferrybridge. Whilst most of the coal bound for Ferrybridge left by rail, some was transported up river using barges, the last of which was delivered in December 2002. The last miners, their families and many former miners marched from Knottingley Town Hall to the Social Club in December 2015.

Sport
A short lived greyhound racing track existed from 1940 to 1946 and again during 1947. The racing was independent (not affiliated to the sports governing body the National Greyhound Racing Club) and was known as a flapping track, which was the nickname given to independent tracks. The venue could accommodate up to 3,000 people.

The town is home to a rugby union club, who meet on Marsh Lane.

Education
Knottingley has one high school, De Lacy Academy formerly called Knottingley High School and Sports College.

It has several primary schools: England Lane Academy, Willow Green Academy,  Knottingley St Botolph's C of E Academy, The Vale Primary Academy and Simpson's Lane Academy.
Sixth-form colleges are located in nearby Pontefract, Wakefield and Selby.

Notable people
Ambrose Askin, rugby league footballer who played in the 1930s
Tom Askin, international rugby league footballer who played in the 1920s and 1930s
Percy Bentley, one of four soldiers to be awarded the Military Cross four times
Terry Cooper, former Leeds United & England footballer.
Rev Thomas Dealtry born here in 1796
Wayne Godwin, Bradford rugby league footballer, and also played for Knottingley Rockware ARLFC
Zak Hardaker, Leeds rugby league footballer, and also played for Knottingley Rockware ARLFC
Bill Horton rugby league footballer who played in the 1920s and 1930s for; Wakefield Trinity, Yorkshire, England and Great Britain
Dale Morton, Wakefield Trinity rugby league footballer, and also played for Knottingley Rockware ARLFC
Craig Moss, Keighley rugby league footballer, and also played for Knottingley Rockware ARLFC
William Sefton Moorhouse, a New Zealand politician
Graham Steadman, Former York, Featherstone Rovers, Castleford & Great Britain rugby league footballer
Professor Austin Tate, Professor of Knowledge-Based Systems at the University of Edinburgh
Ben Thompson, former Marshal of Austin, Texas; gambler and gunman in frontier Texas and Kansas of the United States
Billy Thompson, a gunman and gambler in the American West, and younger brother of Ben Thompson

See also
Listed buildings in Knottingley and Ferrybridge

References

 
Towns in West Yorkshire
Unparished areas in West Yorkshire
Geography of the City of Wakefield